Sonti (Kannada: ಸೊಂಟಿ Telugu: శొంఠి) is a Hindu brahmin family surname. The Sonti family is a prominent Telugu family in Andhra Pradesh.

Notable bearers of the Sonti name include:
 Geetha Madhuri, Artist, Singer
 Ramesh Venkata Sonti, Chief Scientist of CCMB (government biotechnology research establishment)
 Sonti Dakshinamurthy, Director of Health of the Government of Andhra Pradesh, World Health Organization malaria advisor, health deputy director of Singapore, professor of Social and Preventive Medicine
 Sonti Kamesam, inventor, entrepreneur
 Sir S. V. Ramamurthy KCIE Governor of Bombay Presidency

See also
Vaidiki Brahmins
Telugu people

Indian surnames